Ruben Quesada, Ph.D., is an American poet and critic. He was born and raised in Los Angeles, California.

In 2022, Dr. Quesada published an edited collection of essays, Latinx Poetics: Essays on the Art of Poetry was be published by University of New Mexico Press. It "explores the ways in which a people's history and language are vital to the development of a poet's imagination and insists that the meaning and value of poetry are necessary to understand the history and future of a people."

His poetry appears in The Best American Poetry and has earned multiple Pushcart Prize nominations; his writing and criticism appear in The New York Times, Harvard Review, Guernica, The American Poetry Review, TriQuarterly, Ploughshares, Kirkus Reviews and Cimarron Review.

Education 
Dr. Quesada earned a Bachelor of Arts degree in Creative Writing at the University of California, Riverside, a Master of Fine Arts degree in Creative Writing and Writing for the Performing Arts at UC Riverside. In 2012, he then went on to earn a Doctorate in English (Poetry and Poetics) at Texas Tech University.

Career 
After receiving a Ph.D. in English, Dr. Quesada moved to Illinois in 2012. Soon after, with the mentorship of founding members from CantoMundo Poetry, Macondo Writers, and Letras Latinas, he founded the Latinx Writers Caucus at the Association of Writing & Writing Programs (AWP). 

Dr. Quesada served as faculty at Northwestern University, The School of the Art Institute, Vermont College of Fine Arts, UCLA Writers' Program, Columbia College Chicago, where he taught Latinx literature, literary translation, editing, and poetry writing. He is the founding member of the Latinx Writers Caucus, which serves to promote the success of Latinx and Latin American writers at all stages of their career.

In 2018, a chapbook of original poetry and literary translations of Spanish poet Luis Cernuda titled Revelations was published by Sibling Rivalry Press. The title of the collection is inspired by the medieval book by Christian mystic Julian of Norwich, Revelations of Divine Love. He is the author of Next Extinct Mammal (Greenhouse Review Press, 2011), which "revels in the grounded, specific names and places of his California childhood, and invites them to join Zeus and Aphrodite in the pantheon of poetic allusion", and translator of Luis Cernuda: Exiled from the Throne of Night (Aureole Press, 2008).

In 2021, Dr. Quesada began serving on the board of the National Book Critics Circle, where he was the VP of Diversity, Equity, and Inclusion (DEI) from 2021 - 2023; he was Chair of the award in nonfiction for the 2022 publishing year. The same year he was Contributing Editor at TAB Journal at Chapman University in Orange, California. From 2021 - 2022, Quesada launched and served as the host of the Mercy Street Reading Series, a live literary broadcast featuring contemporary poets and writers. 

Currently, Dr. Quesada is an editorial advisor for Jack Leg Press and teaches as an Associate Teaching Fellow at the Attic Institute of Arts & Letters, the UCLA Extension Writers’ Program. He is faculty in the MFA in Creative Writing Program at Antioch University-Los Angeles.

Works 
Exiled from the Throne of Night (Aureole Press, 2008)

Next Extinct Mammal (Greenhouse Review Press, 2011)  

Revelations (Sibling Rivalry Press, 2018) 

Best American Poetry (Simon & Schuster, 2018) 

Latinx Poetics: Essays on the Art of Poetry (University of New Mexico Press, 2022)  

Jane / La Segua (The Offending Adam, 2023)

External links
Author's website
Profile at Poetry Foundation
Profile at The Academy of American Poets

References

Living people
20th-century American poets
21st-century American poets
American magazine editors
American online publication editors
American male poets
American people of Costa Rican descent
American gay writers
Eastern Illinois University faculty
Hispanic and Latino American poets
LGBT Hispanic and Latino American people
LGBT people from California
American LGBT poets
Poets from California
Texas Tech University alumni
University of California, Riverside alumni
Writers from Los Angeles
Year of birth missing (living people)
20th-century American male writers
21st-century American male writers
20th-century American non-fiction writers
21st-century American non-fiction writers
American male non-fiction writers
Gay poets